is a Japanese politician and a former governor of Nagasaki Prefecture located in the Kyushu region of Japan. He was re-elected for another four-year term as governor in both 2014 and 2018.
Nakamura ran for a fourth term in 2022, but lost the elections.

Anti-nuclear
Governor Nakamura together with Nagasaki City mayor Tomihisa Taue filed a protest against the first U.S. nuclear test under President Barack Obama.

References 

1964 births
Living people
Nagasaki University alumni
Politicians from Nagasaki Prefecture
Governors of Nagasaki Prefecture